The 2022 Jagersfontein Tailings Dam Collapse was a structural failure of a mine tailings dam near Jagersfontein, located in the Free State province of South Africa, resulting in a mudslide.

Background
The Jagersfontein Mine is currently the deepest hand-excavated hole in the world and is known for:
 the 972 carat (194.4 g) Excelsior Diamond of 1893 and
 the 637 carat (127.4 g) Reitz Diamond of 1895.

For the duration of the mine's operational history, it was run by De Beers up to 1972, when it was deproclaimed. De Beers did however retain prospecting rights on the property until 2002.

Limited remining operations at the mine were eventually started in September 2010 by a company named Son Op before it changed its name to Jagersfontein Development. Reinet Investments of Luxembourg became involved around 2011, but eventually sold out to Stargems Group around early 2022.

A court case, De Beers Consolidated Mines Ltd v Ataqua Mining (Pty) Ltd, related to historic dumps were found not subject to the Mineral and Petroleum Resources Development Act. All standard National Environmental Management Act processes however still applied.

Tailings Dam Collapse
On 11 September 2022, the dam wall collapsed due to a structural failure. About nine houses were swept away by the mudslide and more than 20 damaged. Three bodies have been found buried under mud with up to 40 people been taken to hospital after sustaining injuries, with four people have been confirmed to be missing.

At 6:00am on 12 September 2022, Eskom was able to restore power to the town.

On 12 September 2022, President Cyril Ramaphosa made a special visit to the town.

On the 28th September 2022, it was reported that a further collapse had occurred.

Related Links
Merriespruit tailings dam disaster
Piezometer Monitoring
Tailings dam

References

2022 in South Africa
2022 disasters in South Africa
September 2022 events in Africa
Dam failures in Africa
Man-made disasters in South Africa
History of the Free State (province)